Edwin Amilgar Hurtado  (born February 1, 1970) is a Venezuelan former middle relief pitcher in Major League Baseball who played from 1995 through 1997 for the Toronto Blue Jays and Seattle Mariners. Listed at 6' 3" , 215 lb. , Hurtado batted and threw right-handed. He was born in Barquisimeto, the capital city of Lara state.

Hurtado was a reliable and durable pitcher during a professional career that spanned 17 years. Considered a workhorse who could pitch every year in different leagues, he relied on a lively fastball and an array of breaking pitches to establish himself as one of the most dependable pitchers in Venezuelan baseball history.

In a three-year majors career, Hurtado posted an 8–9 record with a 6.67 ERA in 43 pitching appearances, including 15 starts and two saves, allowing 111 runs (107 earned) on 85 walks and 167 hits while striking out 79 batters in  innings of work.

Hurtado also pitched 13 Minor League seasons from 1993 to 2006, including stints for the NPB Orix BlueWave in the 1998 and 1999 seasons, and for the KBO LG Twins in 2004. Overall, he went 85–66 with a 3.92 ERA and six saves in 288 games.

In between, Hurtado played winter ball with the Cardenales de Lara and Leones del Caracas clubs of the Venezuelan Professional Baseball League during 16 campaigns from 1991 to 2006. He had a record of 68–47 with a 3.06 ERA and three saves in 199 games, including 631 strikeouts and 314 walks in  innings.

Following his retirement, Hurtado became a pitching coach and has worked for several teams both in the Mexican League and the Venezuelan circuit.

See also
 List of Major League Baseball players from Venezuela

External links
, or Retrosheet, or Pura Pelota – VPBL stats

1970 births
Living people
Acereros de Monclova players
Cardenales de Lara players
Guerreros de Oaxaca players
Hagerstown Suns players
KBO League pitchers
Knoxville Smokies players
Langosteros de Cancún players
Leones de Yucatán players
Leones del Caracas players
LG Twins players
Major League Baseball pitchers
Major League Baseball players from Venezuela
Mexican League baseball pitchers
Nippon Professional Baseball pitchers
Omaha Royals players
Orix BlueWave players
Sportspeople from Barquisimeto
Seattle Mariners players
St. Catharines Blue Jays players
Sultanes de Monterrey players
Toronto Blue Jays players
Tacoma Rainiers players
Venezuelan expatriate baseball players in Canada
Venezuelan expatriate baseball players in Japan
Venezuelan expatriate baseball players in Mexico
Venezuelan expatriate baseball players in South Korea
Venezuelan expatriate baseball players in the United States